Hungarian Romantic composer Franz Liszt (1811–1886) was especially prolific, composing more than 700 works. A virtuoso pianist himself, much of his output is dedicated to solo works for the instrument and is particularly technically demanding. The primary cataloguing system for his compositions was developed by Humphrey Searle; it has been thoroughly revamped by Michael Short and Leslie Howard.

Legend 
The table below gives the following information for works by Franz Liszt (where applicable):
 S. — numbering as given in Humphrey Searle, The Music of Liszt, 1966 (with additions by Sharon Winklhofer and Leslie Howard). A number sign (#) signifies that a number is no longer in use.
 LW. — numbering by R. Charnin Mueller and M. Eckhardt referenced in Grove Music Online (2010)
 Title — normally following the New Liszt Edition and Library of Congress, as well as other authoritative sources
 Forces — the instrumentation used (see Abbreviations for Instruments)
 Key — the principal key of the work
 Date — the year(s) of composition or arrangement, where known
 Genre — works are grouped in the following broad categories: Stage, Choral (for many voices), Vocal (for individual voices), Orchestral, Chamber and Piano
 Notes — Liszt's works often exist in multiple versions and he arranged many works by other composers, which are cross-referenced respectively mentioned here

Catalogue of works

References

External links
 

 
Liszt
Liszt
Liszt
Liszt
Liszt